The  (LSCE, Climate and Environment Sciences Laboratory) is a laboratory for the study of climate and in particular climate change. It is part of the Institute Pierre Simon Laplace, and located on campuses in L'Orme des Merisiers and Gif sur Yvette.

The group plays a prominent role in the framework of the Intergovernmental Panel on Climate Change and includes modellers in glaciology, remote sensing and air quality study.

References

External links 
 Official site (in English)

Climatological research institutes
Climate change organizations
Environment of France
Research institutes in France
Versailles Saint-Quentin-en-Yvelines University
French Alternative Energies and Atomic Energy Commission